Hyloxalus anthracinus is a species of frog in the family Dendrobatidae. It is endemic to Ecuador and occurs on the Cordillera Oriental and in the Mazán River, southern Ecuador. The name anthracinus means "coal black" and refers to the black dorsum of males.

Its natural habitats are páramo, very humid montane forest, and lower humid montane forest. It appears to have declined dramatically, possibly due to chytridiomycosis. It is also threatened by habitat loss.

References

anthracinus
Amphibians of Ecuador
Amphibians of the Andes
Endemic fauna of Ecuador
Páramo fauna
Amphibians described in 1971
Taxonomy articles created by Polbot